Veeravalli Seshadri Varadarajan (18 May 1937 – 25 April 2019) was an Indian mathematician at the University of California, Los Angeles, who worked in many areas of mathematics, including probability, Lie groups and their representations, quantum mechanics, differential equations, and supersymmetry.

Biography

Varadarajan's father, Seshadri, was an Inspector of Schools in the Department of Education. He was transferred to Madras where the medium of instruction was generally English. After Varadarajan completed his high school studies, he joined Intermediate for two years at Loyola College, Madras where he was taught mathematics by K.A. Adivarahan, a very strict disciplinarian who made a strong impression on him. Varadarajan received his undergraduate degree in 1957 from Presidency College, Madras and his doctorate in 1960 from the Indian Statistical Institute in Calcutta, under the supervision of C. R. Rao. He was one of the "famous four" at the Indian Statistical Institute during 1956-1963 (the others being
R. Ranga Rao, K. R. Parthasarathy, and S. R. Srinivasa Varadhan). In 1960, after his doctorate, Varadarajan went to Princeton University as a post-doctoral fellow and in the Fall of 1960 he went to the University of Washington, Seattle where he spent the academic year, followed by a year at the Courant Institute at NYU, after which he returned to the Indian Statistical Institute in 1962.  He joined the Department of Mathematics at UCLA in 1965.  Varadarajan was a member of the Institute for Advanced Study during the periods September 1968 until December 1968 and January 1976 until June 1976.  In March 2019, it was announced by UCLA that Varadarajan and his wife had donated $1 million to the Department of Mathematics at UCLA to establish the Ramanujan Visiting Professorship.

Contributions

Varadarajan's early work, including his doctoral thesis, was in the area of probability theory. He then moved into representation theory where he has done some of his best known work.  He has also done work in mathematical physics, in particular quantum theory and p-adic themes in physics. In the 1980s, he wrote a series of papers with Donald Babbitt on the theory of differential equations with irregular singularities. His latest work has been in supersymmetry.

He introduced Kostant–Parthasarathy–Ranga Rao–Varadarajan determinants along with Bertram Kostant, K. R. Parthasarathy and R. Ranga Rao in 1967, the Trombi–Varadarajan theorem in 1972 and the Enright–Varadarajan modules in 1975.

Recognition

He was awarded the Onsager Medal in 1998 for his work. He was recognized along with 23 Indian and Indian American members "who have made outstanding contributions to the creation, exposition advancement, communication, and utilization of mathematics" by the Fellows of the American Mathematical Society program on 1 November 2012.

Bibliography
Varadarajan, Veeravalli S (1984). Geometry of quantum theory, Springer-Verlag. 1st Edition 1968.
; 

; 

Varadarajan, Veeravalli S. (2004). Supersymmetry for mathematicians: an introduction. Vol. 11. American Mathematical Society.

Selected publications 
 Parthasarathy, K., Rao, R., & Varadarajan, V. (1967). Representations of Complex Semi-Simple Lie Groups and Lie Algebras. Annals of Mathematics, 85(3), second series, 383–429. doi:10.2307/1970351
.
 Enright, T., & Varadarajan, V. (1975). On an Infinitesimal Characterization of the Discrete Series. Annals of Mathematics, 102(1), second series, 1–15. doi:10.2307/1970970

See also
Born rule

References

External links

Home page of Veeravalli S. Varadarajan
In Memoriam: Veeravalli Seshadri Varadarajan
V S Varadarajan at the Indian Statistical Institute, Calcutta (K. R. Parthasarathy)

1937 births
2019 deaths
20th-century Indian mathematicians
Probability theorists
University of California, Los Angeles faculty
Indian Statistical Institute alumni
21st-century Indian mathematicians
Presidency College, Chennai alumni
Fellows of the American Mathematical Society